The 2009 Afghan avalanches occurred near Kabul, Afghanistan on 16 January 2009. At least ten people were killed and twelve vehicles and machinery used to clear the road of snow were swept away when the avalanche struck a highway. Forty people were rescued, eleven of whom were injured by the avalanches. Searchers spent the next two days and beyond locating the victims.

References 

2009 natural disasters
Transport disasters in Afghanistan
2009 in Afghanistan
History of Afghanistan (1992–present)
2000s avalanches
January 2009 events in Asia
Avalanches in Afghanistan
2009 disasters in Afghanistan